The Hongkong and Shanghai Banking Corporation Limited, India (HSBC India) or HSBC Bank India, is incorporated in Hong Kong SAR with limited liability. It is a foreign bank under the Banking Regulation Act, 1949 and thus is regulated by the Reserve Bank of India (RBI).  As per the data available with the Ministry of Company Affairs (MCA), the Indian branch is registered under the number F00947 and is incorporated in India since 1 January 1983. The registered office is at Mumbai, India.

Businesses

Wealth and Personal Banking
Commercial Banking
Global Banking and Markets

HSBC Group members in India

 The Hongkong and Shanghai Banking Corporation Limited
 HSBC Asset Management (India) Private Limited
 HSBC Electronic Data Processing (India) Private Limited
 HSBC Professional Services (India) Private Limited
 HSBC Securities and Capital Markets (India) Private Limited
 HSBC Software Development (India) Private Limited
 HSBC InvestDirect (India) Limited
 HSBC InvestDirect Securities (India) Private Limited 
 HSBC InvestDirect Financial Service (India) Limited 
 HSBC Agency (India) Private Limited
 HSBC Global Shared Services (India) Private Limited

HSBC Technology India 

HSBC Technology India (HTI), previously called HSBC Global Technology (GLT), is part of HSBC Technology, the Bank's technology function. HTI is located in Pune, India, and Hyderabad, India, with the former being the headquarters. HSBC Technology India has been in existence for over 15 years, and currently supports the majority of the software products that make up the Bank's technology eco-system.

HTI is headed by Pradip Menon, who is also global CIO for the Retail Banking and Wealth Management business, as well as Global Head of Application Development and Maintenance.

Apart from India, HSBC Technology centers are present in Sri Lanka, China, Malaysia, Poland, and Canada.

References

External links

 About HSBC

Banking in India
India
Indian subsidiaries of foreign companies
Software companies of India